Raraju may refer to:

 Raraju (1984 film), Indian Telugu-language film
 Raraju (2006 film), Indian Telugu-language film